Olin may refer to:

People

Organizations
 OLIN, American landscape architecture firm
 Olin Business School at Washington University in St. Louis
 Olin College, an undergraduate engineering college in Massachusetts
 Olin Corporation, a chemical corporation with a history of producing chemicals and ammunition
 Olin Edirne, the former name of Turkish basketball team Eskişehir Basket
 F. W. Olin Foundation, a foundation endowed by Franklin W. Olin
 John M. Olin Foundation, a foundation endowed by John M. Olin
 Preston and Olin Institute, a defunct Methodist boys' school now a part of Virginia Tech

Places
 Olin, Iowa, a small city in the United States
 Olin, North Carolina, an unincorporated community in the United States
 Olin, Poland
 Olin's Covered Bridge, the only bridge in Ashtabula county, Ohio named for a family
 Olin Observatory, an astronomical observatory in New London, Connecticut
 Olin Sang Ruby Union Institute, a Jewish overnight summer camp in Wisconsin

Fictional characters
 Olin, a character on the TV series General Hospital
 Gerald Olin, character in the 2007 film 1408 portrayed by Samuel L. Jackson

Other uses
 Nahui Ollin, also spelled Ōlīn, a concept in Aztec mythology potentially related to Tōnatiuh
 Olin (spider), a spider genus in the family Trochanteriidae
 Olin Palladium Award, an award given by the Electrochemical Society
 Olin Raschig process, an industrial process for manufacturing hydrazine

See also